Galbraith and Sons was a retailing company based in Paisley, Scotland. The company grew to over 220 stores, establishing their own food production plants to supply their stores. Galbraith's were acquired in 1954 by Home and Colonial, becoming part of the Allied Suppliers Group. Galbraith's survived as one of the Scottish trading names for Allied Suppliers until 1987, when it disappeared as part of the Argyll Supermarkets re-branding to Safeway Stores.

History

Stores 
Galbraith's Stores first shop was established in Linwood Village, Paisley in 1894. Within 6 years the company had 12 stores and had expanded to over 59 shops by 1919. To minimise capital outlay the stores (usually located in Tenement Blocks) were rented, designed in a uniform style and had narrow shop frontages. The store network grew rapidly, by 1939 the company had over 159 grocery branches and 12 butchers shops. Along with a "provisions" window, staple items such as tea, sugar and bakery goods were advertised with the emphasis on price. By the time of the sale to Home and Colonial the store network had expanded to over 220 stores and was regarded as the leading independent grocery business in the west of Scotland

Distribution 
The stores were originally served by a single warehouse (in Paisley). As the store network grew a second warehouse was added (in Glasgow) closely followed by a third warehouse (across the River Clyde in Govan, Glasgow).

Manufacturing 
Manufacturing was a key success to their growth. By owning their manufacturing, the company increased the profitability and secured supplies to their stores. The company established a bakery in 1895 at George Street, Paisley) to supply their own stores following a dispute with their former supplier, J and J Swann. By 1911 a second bakery was added in Govan to supply the Glasgow branches. Meat Production was established at the George Street warehouse in 1896 when two ham curers were employed, closely followed by sausage making. Tea blending (by hand) was undertaken by Galbraith's (one of the few retailers to purchase tea directly and blend). Preserve manufacturing (and pickle manufacturing) was added in 1918 following a dispute with James Robertson.

Acquisition
The company was acquired in 1954 by Home and Colonial Stores for £2,340,000.00, becoming a principal Scottish subsidiary of the Allied Suppliers network.
Under Allied Suppliers the bakery and pickle factory were quickly sold to their respective management. By 1956 the sausage and cooked meats factory was transferred to the Richmond Sausage Company (becoming their major regional Scottish factory). Allied Suppliers preserve manufacturing was concentrated at Galbraith's Paisley premises. (was the bakery business not acquired by Lyons? I seem to remember their vans at the Glasgow premises in Craigton Road, Govan.)

Trading name
The company was formed as Galbraith and Sons Limited (in 1894), the name was later changed to Galbraith's Stores Limited and survived as a trading subsidiary of Argyll Supermarkets (along with R&J Templeton) until 1987

References

Retail companies established in 1894
Defunct supermarkets of the United Kingdom
Defunct retail companies of the United Kingdom
1894 establishments in Scotland
Companies based in Paisley, Renfrewshire
Retail companies of Scotland
Defunct companies of Scotland
Retail companies disestablished in 1987
Food manufacturers of Scotland
Scottish brands
Defunct manufacturing companies of the United Kingdom
British companies established in 1894